Shaiju Mon (born 16 May 1991) is an Indian professional football player who plays for Mohan Bagan in the I-League.

Early career
Mon was born in Thiruvananthapuram, Kerala. Being the first footballer in his family, he got selected in his school team (MEC, Hosur) when he was studying in Class 8. Later, when he was in the 12th Standard, he played for the coastal team of his home town.

After seeing his performance in his college team, he got chance to play for a 2nd Division team of Kerala, SKVC in the year 2008.

While playing for Chandni FC in the 2009–10 season, he represented that club in the 2010 I-League 2nd Division. He scored a goal against Eagles F.C., with the match ending in a 1–1 draw. He was also adjudged Man of the Match in that game.

Chirag United Kerala
In 2010 summer Shaiju signed for Chirag United Club Kerala in 2011–12 I-League.

Pailan Arrows
Shaiju signed for pailan arrows in June 2012 for 2012–13 I-League. He made his debut for the club on 25 August 2012 during the 2012 Durand Cup against Delhi United in which Pailan drew 2–2.

On 24 March 2013, he scored against Mohun Bagan A.C.

Mohun Bagan
On 29 October 2013 it was confirmed that Shaiju Mon has signed for Mohun Bagan. 
He made his debut in the I-League on 6 November 2013 against Shillong Lajong F.C. at the Jawaharlal Nehru Stadium, Shillong in which he came on as a substitute for Zakeer Mundampara in the 86th minute as Mohun Bagan drew the match 1-1.

International
Mon made his debut for the India U23 team on 23 June 2012 against Lebanon during the qualifying round for the 2013 AFC U-22 Asian Cup.

Career statistics

Club

References

Indian footballers
1991 births
Living people
I-League players
Footballers from Kerala
Chirag United Club Kerala players
Indian Arrows players
Mohun Bagan AC players
Sportspeople from Thiruvananthapuram
Association football midfielders